Grevillea ilicifolia, commonly known as holly grevillea or holly bush, is a species of flowering plant in the family Proteaceae and is endemic to southern continental Australia. It is a spreading to prostrate shrub with holly-like leaves with sharply-pointed triangular to egg-shaped teeth or lobes, and clusters of green to cream-coloured and mauve flowers with a pink to red style.

Description
The style is pink to red, sometimes orange to pale yellow, and green-tipped.

Taxonomy
This species was first formally described in 1810 by Scottish botanist Robert Brown who gave it the name Anadenia ilicifolia in the Transactions of the Linnean Society of London. In 1830, Brown changed the name to Grevillea ilicifolia in his Supplementum primum prodromi florae Novae Hollandiae. The specific epithet (ilicifolia) means "holly-leaved".

In 2004, Trisha L. Downing described two subspecies of G. ilicifolia in Australian Systematic Botany and the names are accepted by the Australian Plant Census:
Grevillea ilicifolia (R.Br.)
Grevilla ilicifolia subsp. lobata (F.Muell.)

Distribution and habitat
Grevillea ilicifolia grows in mallee, heath or shrubland in south-eastern South Australia, including the Eyre Peninsula and Kangaroo Island, in western inland Victoria, and near Griffith in western New South Wales. Subspecies lobata is restricted to north-western Victoria and the Murray and South-eastern botanical districts of South Australia.

Conservation status
Grevillea ilicifolia subsp. ilicifolia is listed as "critically endangered" in New South Wales, under the Biodiversity Conservation Act 2016. The main threats to the species in New South Wales are land clearing, inappropriate fire regimes and browsing by herbivores

References

ilicifolia
Flora of New South Wales
Flora of South Australia
Flora of Victoria (Australia)
Proteales of Australia
Taxa named by Robert Brown (botanist, born 1773)
Plants described in 1810